Lewis Allan (born 25 October 1996) is a Scottish footballer who plays as a striker for Berwick Rangers.

Allan has previously played for Hibernian, Dunfermline Athletic, Forfar Athletic, Livingston, Edinburgh City and Raith Rovers.

Club career
Allan made one appearance for Hibernian in the 2014–15 season, against Falkirk on 6 December. In February 2015, Allan was loaned to Dunfermline Athletic, making eight appearances before returning from his loan at the end of March 2015.

In August 2015, Allan was loaned to Forfar Athletic until the end of the 2015–16 season, however his loan was cut short when he had to have a bone cyst removed from his thoracic spine. In August 2016, Allan once again returned to a Scottish League One club on loan, this time with West Lothian side Livingston. After making just three appearances as a substitute and with further appearances likely being restricted, Allan returned to Hibernian at the start of October 2016. On 31 January 2017, Allan moved out on loan, this time to Scottish League Two side Edinburgh City. Allan subsequently re-joined Edinburgh City on a six-month development loan deal on 6 July 2017.

Allan was released by Hibernian in May 2019. He then signed a contract with Raith Rovers on 2 July 2019.

Berwick Rangers announced the signing of Allan on 14 September 2020.

Career statistics

References

1996 births
Living people
People from Galashiels
Sportspeople from the Scottish Borders
Scottish footballers
Association football forwards
Hibernian F.C. players
Dunfermline Athletic F.C. players
Forfar Athletic F.C. players
Livingston F.C. players
F.C. Edinburgh players
Scottish Professional Football League players
Raith Rovers F.C. players